PY-19 may refer to:

USS Carnelian (PY-19), a WWII converted yacht
The ISO 3166-2:PY code of the Boquerón Paraguay Department